The Remington Model 700 is a series of bolt-action centerfire rifles manufactured by Remington Arms since 1962.  It is a development of the Remington 721 and 722 series of rifles, which were introduced in 1948.  The M24 and M40 military sniper rifles, used by the US Army and Marine Corps, respectively, are both based on the Model 700 design.

The Remington 700 series rifles often come with a 3-, 4- or 5-round internal magazine depending on the caliber chambered, some of which have a hinged floor-plate for quick unloading, and some of which are "blind" (with no floor-plate). The rifle can also be ordered with a detachable box magazine. The Model 700 is available in many different stock, barrel and caliber configurations, with many third-party and aftermarket variants in the market built on the same action footprint. From 1978 to 1982, Remington offered the Sportsman 78 which is the same model 700 action but with cheaper features such as a plain stock without checkering. The Sportsman 78 was not included in the recall that affected the trigger group.

Development
After World War II, Remington Arms engineer Mike Walker began designing lower-cost alternatives to the Model 30, which resulted in the Model 721. These used a cylindrical receiver produced from cylindrical bar stock that could be turned on a lathe, rather than machined in a series of milling operations, which significantly reduced the cost of production. In addition, small metal parts, including the bottom metal, were stamped, and the stocks were not finished as highly as older models. Further developments of the basic 721 action under the direction of Walker produced the Model 722 and Model 725, and ultimately in 1962, the Model 700.

Walker sought to increase the accuracy of the rifles, by utilizing tight tolerances in the chamber and bore, a short leade, and a very fast lock time. Like the earlier 721, the Remington 700 action was designed for mass production. Remington initially produced two variants of the Model 700, the ADL and BDL, in both long- and short-action rifles that allowed for the chambering of different cartridges. In 1969, Remington introduced several upgrades for the rifle, including a longer rear bolt shroud, a jeweled bolt and improved stock finishing. Four years later, the production of left-handed versions of the rifle began, to compete with the Savage Model 110, which was at that time the only major rifle manufactured with a left-handed variant. Other versions of the rifle, including the titanium receiver 700ti, the 700 SPS (which replaced the ADL in 2005), and the CDL have since been introduced. In addition to its development as a hunting rifle, the Model 700 also provided the basis for military and police sniper rifles, starting with the M40 rifle in 1966, which was initially ordered by the United States Marine Corps. The US Army adopted the M24 Sniper Weapon System in 1986.

Design
It is a manually operated bolt action with two forward dual-opposed lugs. The bolt face is recessed, fully enclosing the base of the cartridge, The extractor is a C-clip sitting within the bolt face. The ejector is a plunger on the bolt face actuated by a coil spring. The bolt is of 3-piece construction, brazed together (head, body and bolt handle). The receiver is milled from round cross-section steel.

The Remington 700 comes in a large number of variants. The symmetrical two-lug bolt body has a  diameter.

To these can be added various magazine configurations; a blind magazine which has no floorplate, a conventional magazine with a detachable floorplate and a detachable box magazine. There are standard consumer versions as well as versions designed for military and police use. Some variants come with bipods, slings and other accessories.

Model 700: standard versions

Remington produces the Mountain LSS model with a stainless steel barrel and laminated stock. Heavy barrel versions with laminated stocks like the Model 700 SPS varmint are available for varmint hunting. The Model 700 ADL was replaced as the most economical Model 700 by the Model 700 SPS (Special Purpose Synthetic) in newer production.

Remington produced a 700 ML muzzleloading rifle from 1996 onward. The EtronX electronic primer ignition system was implemented in the Model 700 EtronX introduced in 2000, though this model was a commercial failure and ceased production in 2003, along with the EtronX primers themselves.

Model 700P: police version

Remington markets the 700 to military forces and civilian law-enforcement agencies under the "Remington Law Enforcement" and "Remington Military" banners, with the military/law enforcement 700s being called the Model 700P ("Police").

The 700P series appears to have been influenced by the designs, features, and success of the M24 Sniper Weapon System and the M40 series, with one feature of the Model 700P series being the heavier and thicker barrel for increased accuracy and reduced recoil.  The rifle was chambered for the .308 Winchester cartridge as well as the .223 Remington, .243 Winchester, 7 mm Remington Magnum, .300 Winchester Magnum, .300 Remington Ultra Magnum, and .338 Lapua Magnum.  The 700P has a 26" barrel, an aluminium block bedding in its stock, which is made by HS Precision.

The 700P is also marketed to the public. Remington also sells the standard U.S. Army-issue Leupold Mark IV M3 10x40 mm telescopic sight used by the Army's M24 as an optional feature. Remington offers similarly styled, less expensive versions under the Special Purpose Synthetic (or SPS) name.

Model 700: military version

Both the U.S. Army's M24 Sniper Weapon System and U.S. Marine Corps' M40 sniper rifles are built from the Remington Model 700 rifle, in different degrees of modification, the main difference being the custom fitted heavy contour barrel and action length. The M24 utilizes the Long action and the M40 employs the short action bolt-face. The reason for this is that the M24 was originally intended to chamber the longer .300 Winchester Magnum round. The M40, however, was not intended to be chambered in the more powerful .300 Winchester Magnum round, yet the Marine Corps' intention was to migrate to the .300 Winchester Magnum cartridge. The Marine Corps' delay has led to a change in migratory direction, the current goal is for the M40 to become a rifle chambered in .338 Lapua Magnum.

The United States Army's Joint Munitions and Lethality Contracting Center has awarded Remington a Firm Fixed Price (FFP) Indefinite Delivery/ Indefinite Quantity (ID/IQ) contract (W15QKN-10-R-0403) for the upgrade of up to 3,600 M24 Sniper Weapon Systems (SWS) currently fielded to the Army pending type classification as the “M24E1”. The major configuration change for this system is the caliber conversion from 7.62mm NATO (.308 Winchester) to .300 Winchester Magnum to provide soldiers with additional precision engagement capability and range. The contract is for a five year period and has guaranteed minimum value of $192K with a potential value of up to $28.2 million. This award follows a full and open competitive evaluation lasting nine months, which began with the release of the Army's Request for Proposal (RFP) on January 13, 2010. The program will be executed under the authority of Project Manager Soldier Weapons, Picatinny Arsenal, NJ, and managed by its subordinate unit, Product Manager Individual Weapons. In 2009 the U.S. Army has changed the weapon name from M24E1 to the XM2010 Enhanced Sniper Rifle.

Remington Model Seven 
The Remington Model Seven carbine is a compact version of the Remington 700 built around a short action and chambered in the .223 Rem and .308 Win class cartridges. Introduced in 1983, the stock is shorter than the standard version and the barrel is only 18.5".

Users

: New South Wales Police Force State Protection Group
: Royal Canadian Mounted Police (RCMP).
: Remington 700 PSS used by People's Armed Police
: Komando Pasukan Katak (Kopaska) tactical diver group and Komando Pasukan Khusus (Kopassus) special forces group.
: Israeli Police and Israel Defense Forces special forces, replaced by Mauser 86SR and M24 SWS
: Pasukan Gerakan Khas (PGK).
: Philippine Marine Corps (PMC).
: Sierra Leone Police
: U.S. Border Patrol, United States Marine Corps, United States Navy, United States Army, Cambridge Police Department (Massachusetts).
: Ukrainian Army

Controversy

Thousands of Remington Model 700 customers have complained to Remington that a defect in the trigger mechanism could fire the gun without the trigger being squeezed. Remington received nearly 2,000 complaints from 2013 through 2016. 150 lawsuits have been filed against Remington alleging injury or death related to the trigger. Lawsuits have alleged that Remington covered up a design flaw in the trigger mechanism resulting in dozens of deaths and hundreds of serious injuries. A class action lawsuit alleges Remington knowingly sold a defective product. The Attorneys general from nine states and the District of Columbia objected to the proposed settlement in the class action, saying that Remington has "long known" of the defect and that the proposed settlement "fails to adequately protect public safety."

On October 20, 2010, CNBC televised the first in an ongoing investigative series, Remington Under Fire: a CNBC Investigation, reporting that the trigger mechanism used prior to 2007 on the Model 700 could fire without the trigger being squeezed. The report stated that Remington has received thousands of customer complaints since the firing mechanism was introduced in the 1940s and that nearly two dozen deaths and hundreds of injuries had been attributed to inadvertent discharges of 700 series rifles. Through internal Remington documents, the program showed that on multiple occasions the company considered recalling the product.

The inventor of the firing mechanism, Merle "Mike" Walker, 98 years old at the time of the documentary, told CNBC he proposed what he called a safer trigger in 1948 while the product was still in the testing stage. Walker said his enhanced design was rejected because of the added cost, 5 1/2 cents per gun (adjusted for inflation: $). Critics of the documentary countered that every incident featured on the program  involving loss of life was the result of firearms mishandling where owners pointed their rifles at other human beings. Remington responded with the Remington Model 700 Network which gave direct rebuttals to the program, and their perspective on the incidents the program describes. Remington dismisses the allegations, pointing out that in every case either trigger mechanisms of the rifles were adjusted or altered beyond recommended specifications, rifles were poorly maintained and left to rust, or was a result of misuse of the  rifle. Those involved admitted to police they might "possibly" have pulled the trigger.

Though Remington has since changed to a new, cheaper, trigger mechanism design, the original Walker trigger is still produced for the US military and buyers of custom rifles.

On December 6, 2014, Remington announced that as part of actions put into place to settle multiple lawsuits and to avoid future legal actions, they are replacing all triggers in the Model 700s.  Over 7.85 million rifles are included in this agreement, making all of them eligible for the replacements.

On February 19, 2017, CBS News' 60 Minutes aired a segment on the Remington 700 trigger mechanism safety. The episode highlighted incidents of accidental deaths as a result of Remington 700s firing without the trigger being pulled, problems with Remington's  trigger mechanism replacement program, and a class-action lawsuit filed by Remington owners.

See also
 List of firearms
 List of rifle cartridges
 Table of handgun and rifle cartridges

Footnotes

References

External links

 CNBC program on the Remington 700
 Remington Under Fire investigative journalism since 2010 by CNBC
 Remington Model 700 product page

Bolt-action rifles of the United States
Sniper rifles of the United States
Police weapons
Remington Arms firearms
Hunting rifles
.300 Winchester Magnum firearms